Bernardino Herrera Casanueva (born 15 October 1977 in Santander, Cantabria) is a field hockey goalkeeper from Spain. He earned his first cap for the Men's National Team in 1998 during the Champions Trophy tournament in Lahore, Pakistan. He is also the husband of the female hockey star Silvia Muñoz.

Herrera competed in two Summer Olympics for his native country, starting in 2000. There he finished in ninth position, followed by the fourth place in Athens. The goalie of Club de Campo Villa de Madrid won the title at the Champions Trophy in Lahore, and at the 2005 Men's Hockey European Nations Cup in Leipzig.

External links

 Profile on Athens 2004-website

1977 births
Living people
Sportspeople from Santander, Spain
Field hockey players from Cantabria
Spanish male field hockey players
Male field hockey goalkeepers
Olympic field hockey players of Spain
Field hockey players at the 2000 Summer Olympics
2002 Men's Hockey World Cup players
Field hockey players at the 2004 Summer Olympics
2006 Men's Hockey World Cup players
Club de Campo Villa de Madrid players